Lieutenant-General Sir William Forbes Gatacre  (3 December 1843 – 18 January 1906) was a British soldier who served between 1862 and 1904 in India and Africa. He commanded the British Army Division at the Battle of Omdurman and the 3rd Division during the first months of the Second Boer War, during which time he suffered a humiliating defeat at the Battle of Stormberg.

Early life
William Forbes Gatacre was born at Herbertshire Castle, near Stirling on 3 December 1843.  He was the third son of Edward Lloyd Gatacre, of Gatacre in the parish of Claverley, Shropshire, and Jessie Forbes, whose father William Forbes owned Herbertshire Castle. He was educated at the Royal Military College, Sandhurst, and entered the army as an ensign of the 77th Foot in 1862, posted to India. He purchased the rank of lieutenant on 23 December 1864.

Military career
He reached the rank of captain by purchase on 7 December 1870, before the purchase of commissions was abolished in the early 1870s and passed into Staff College in 1873. Between 1875 and 1879 he returned to Sandhurst as an instructor of surveying. He then returned to India with his regiment in 1880, being promoted to major on 23 March 1881.

On 29 April 1882 he was promoted to lieutenant-colonel and appointed to command a battalion on 28 June 1884 until he was made Deputy Quartermaster General in December 1885.

After service in the Hazara Expedition of 1888, and command of the Mandalay brigade during the Tonhon expedition in Burma in 1889–90, Gatacre gained the substantive rank of colonel and became Adjutant-General of the Bombay Army with local rank of major-general on 25 November 1890. While serving as a major-general in India in the early 1890s he was bitten by a jackal whilst hunting with the Bombay Jackal Club and, temporarily deranged, had his bungalow windows barred against jackals.

He was put in command of a second class district in India in January 1894. In the following year he commanded the Third Brigade of the Chitral Relief Force, and was mentioned in Lieutenant-General Sir Robert Low's dispatch of 1 May 1895. As Chairman of the Bombay Plague Committee he prepared the 3 volume 1896-7 Report on the Bubonic Plague of Bombay.

He returned home to command a brigade at Aldershot Command in August 1897.

Gatacre was selected to command the British Army forces during the reconquest of the Sudan, serving under General Kitchener, Commander-in-Chief of the Egyptian Army. In the Sudan, he commanded the British Brigade at the Battle of Atbara in April 1898, and a division of two British brigades at the Battle of Omdurman. Returning to England, he served as General Officer Commanding Eastern District from December 1898 to October 1899.

At the outbreak of the Second Boer War, Gatacre was placed at the head of the 3rd division, with the rank of lieutenant-general. He was the commanding general of the Imperial forces at the Battle of Stormberg, during "Black Week", in which 135 men were killed and 696 captured in an ambush. His reputation, high after Omdurman, sank after Stormberg, and he returning to England and to his pre-war posting as General Officer Commanding Eastern District from June 1900 to December 1903. He retired in 1904.

In 1906 he embarked on a trading expedition through Anglo-Egyptian Sudan. He died of fever near Gambela, Ethiopia, an Anglo-Sudanese enclave leased by Emperor Menelik II, where Britain was in the process of establishing a port and customs station.

Gatacre had a reputation of working his men hard, with his energetic style of leadership leading to subordinate officers often resenting him for not letting them get on with their jobs in their own way.  The ordinary soldiers called him "General Backacher" but recognised that his activities were generally benevolent and on the whole thought well of him.

Family
His elder brother was Major-General Sir John Gatacre who served in the Indian Army.

William Gatacre married twice, first in 1876 to Alice Susan Louisa, third daughter of Anthony La Touche Kerwen, Dean of Limerick.  After they divorced in 1892, he remarried in 1895 to Beatrix, daughter of Horace Davey, Baron Davey.
He had three sons by his first marriage.  The youngest, Major John Kirwan Gatacre, who had been educated at Rugby and Sandhurst, and posted to the Indian Army where he served with 11th King Edward's Own Lancers (Probyn's Horse), was killed in action in France on 13 October 1914 whilst attached to 4th Queen's Own Hussars.

Gatacre's widow, Lady Beatrix Gatacre wrote his biography in General Gatacre: The story of the life and services of Sir William Forbes Gatacre, K.C.B., D.S.O. 1843-1906 (London, 1910).

Awards
7 December 1888: awarded the Distinguished Service Order.
24 January 1896: made Companion of the Order of the Bath (CB).
15 November 1898: CB upgraded to Knight Commander of the Order of the Bath.
10 May 1899: awarded the Order of the Medjidie Second Class.
23 May 1900: awarded the Gold Kaisar-i-Hind Medal for services as Chairman of the plague committee of Bombay City 1896 & 1897.
His memorial, shown above, confirms he was also a Knight of Grace of the Order of St John

References

Notes

Sources

External links
 
 

|-

1843 births
1906 deaths
Academics of the Royal Military College, Sandhurst
British Army lieutenant generals
Middlesex Regiment officers
77th Regiment of Foot officers
British Army personnel of the Mahdist War
British Army personnel of the Second Boer War
British military personnel of the Chitral Expedition
Companions of the Distinguished Service Order
Knights Commander of the Order of the Bath
Graduates of the Royal Military College, Sandhurst
People from Falkirk (council area)
Recipients of the Kaisar-i-Hind Medal
Recipients of the Order of the Medjidie, 2nd class